Molecule-based magnets (MBMs) or molecular magnets are a class of materials capable of displaying ferromagnetism and other more complex magnetic phenomena. This class expands the materials properties typically associated with magnets to include low density, transparency, electrical insulation, and low-temperature fabrication, as well as combine magnetic ordering with other properties such as photoresponsiveness. Essentially all of the common magnetic phenomena associated with conventional transition-metal magnets and rare-earth magnets can be found in molecule-based magnets. Prior to 2011, MBMs were seen to exhibit "magnetic ordering with Curie temperature (Tc) exceeding room temperature".

History
The first synthesis and characterization of MBMs was accomplished by Wickman and co-workers in 1967. This was a diethyldithiocarbamate-Fe(III) chloride compound.

In February 1992, Gatteschi and Sessoli published on MBMs with particular attention to the fabrication of systems in which stable organic radicals are coupled to metal ions. At that date, the highest Tc on record was measured by SQUID magnetometer as 30K.

The field exploded in 1996 with the publication of a book on "Molecular Magnetism: From Molecular Assemblies to the Devices".

In February 2007, de Jong et al grew thin-film TCNE MBM in situ, while in September 2007, photoinduced magnetism was demonstrated in a TCNE organic-based magnetic semiconductor.

The June 2011 issue of Chemical Society Reviews was devoted to MBMs. In the editorial, written by Miller and Gatteschi, are mentioned TCNE and above-room-temperature magnetic ordering along with many other unusual properties of MBMs.

Theory
The mechanism by which molecule-based magnets stabilize and display a net magnetic moment is different than that present in traditional metal- and ceramic-based magnets. For metallic magnets, the unpaired electrons align through quantum mechanical effects (termed exchange) by virtue of the way in which the electrons fill the orbitals of the conductive band. For most oxide-based ceramic magnets, the unpaired electrons on the metal centers align via the intervening diamagnetic bridging oxide (termed superexchange). The magnetic moment in molecule-based magnets is typically stabilized by one or more of three main mechanisms:

Through space or dipolar coupling
Exchange between orthogonal (non-overlapping) orbitals in the same spatial region
Net moment via antiferromagnetic coupling of non-equal spin centers (ferrimagnetism)

In general, molecule-based magnets tend to be of low dimensionality. Classic magnetic alloys based on iron and other ferromagnetic materials feature metallic bonding, with all atoms essentially bonded to all nearest neighbors in the crystal lattice. Thus, critical temperatures at which point these classical magnets cross over to the ordered magnetic state tend to be high, since interactions between spin centers is strong. Molecule-based magnets, however, have spin bearing units on molecular entities, often with highly directional bonding. In some cases, chemical bonding is restricted to one dimension (chains). Thus, interactions between spin centers are also limited to one dimension, and ordering temperatures are much lower than metal/alloy-type magnets. Also, large parts of the magnetic material are essentially diamagnetic, and contribute nothing to the net magnetic moment.

Applications
In 2015 oxo-dimeric Fe(salen)-based magnets ("anticancer nanomagnets") in a water suspension were shown to demonstrate intrinsic room temperature ferromagnetic behavior, as well as antitumor activity, with possible medical applications in chemotherapy, magnetic drug delivery, magnetic resonance imaging (MRI), and magnetic field-induced local hyperthermia therapy.

Background
Molecule-based magnets comprise a class of materials which differ from conventional magnets in one of several ways. Most traditional magnetic materials are comprised purely of metals (Fe, Co, Ni) or metal oxides (CrO2) in which the unpaired electrons spins that contribute to the net magnetic moment reside only on metal atoms in d- or f-type orbitals.

In molecule-based magnets, the structural building blocks are molecular in nature. These building blocks are either purely organic molecules, coordination compounds or a combination of both. In this case, the unpaired electrons may reside in d or f orbitals on isolated metal atoms, but may also reside in highly localized s and p orbitals as well on the purely organic species. Like conventional magnets, they may be classified as hard or soft, depending on the magnitude of the coercive field.

Another distinguishing feature is that molecule-based magnets are prepared via low-temperature solution-based techniques, versus high-temperature metallurgical processing or electroplating (in the case of magnetic thin films). This enables a chemical tailoring of the molecular building blocks to tune the magnetic properties.

Specific materials include purely organic magnets made of organic radicals for example p-nitrophenyl nitronyl nitroxides, decamethylferrocenium tetracyanoethenide, mixed coordination compounds with bridging organic radicals, Prussian blue related compounds, and charge-transfer complexes.

Molecule-based magnets derive their net moment from the cooperative effect of the spin-bearing molecular entities, and can display bulk ferromagnetic and ferrimagnetic behavior with a true critical temperature. In this regard, they are contrasted with single-molecule magnets, which are essentially superparamagnets (displaying a blocking temperature versus a true critical temperature). This critical temperature represents the point at which the materials switches from a simple paramagnet to a bulk magnet, and can be detected by ac susceptibility and specific heat measurements.

References

Types of magnets
Drug delivery devices
Magnetic devices